The 2013–14 Ligakupa was the 7th edition of the Hungarian League Cup, the Ligakupa.

Group stage

Group A

Group B

Group C

Group D

Group E

Group F

Group G

Group H

Round of 16

First leg

The games will be played on 22, 25 and 26 February.

Second leg

Quarterfinals

First leg

Second leg

Semifinals

First leg

Second leg

Final

External links
 soccerway.com
 worldfootball.com

2013–14 in Hungarian football
2013–14 domestic association football cups
2013-14